George Colin Ratsey (30 July 1906 – 12 March 1984), educated at Brighton College, was a British sailor and sail maker who competed in the 1932 Summer Olympics. He won the silver medal in the Star class. He is the son of George Ernest Ratsey and granduncle of another Olympic sailor, Franklin Ratsey Woodroffe.

See also
 Ratsey and Lapthorn

References

External links
 George Colin Ratsey at Olympic Database

1906 births
1984 deaths
British male sailors (sport)
Sailors at the 1932 Summer Olympics – Snowbird
Sailors at the 1932 Summer Olympics – Star
Olympic sailors of Great Britain
Olympic silver medallists for Great Britain
Olympic medalists in sailing
Medalists at the 1932 Summer Olympics